The Collaborative Hypertext of Radiology (or "CHORUS") is a free medical reference database based on a system originally developed at the University of Chicago and currently maintained at the Medical College of Wisconsin.

External links
 

Medical databases